Otto Rothstock (10 April 1904 – 26 May 1990 in Hannover) was an Austrian living in Germany, who assassinated Jewish writer Hugo Bettauer.

As a young member of various different political parties, Rothstock was enraged by Bettauer's newspapers that he claimed to be pornographic. On March 10, 1925, Rothstock entered Bettauer's office and shot him five times at point-blank range. Hugo Bettauer died on March 26, 1925, from his wounds.

At his trial, Rothstock justified what he had done as necessary to save European culture from the menace of degeneration. His lawyer, Walter Riehl, (himself a National Socialist functionary) argued that his client was guilty but insane, with which the jury agreed. However, within twenty months Rothstock was released as “cured” from a mental hospital.  A fair amount of money was collected from the general public for him.

Rothstock was an unrepentant Nazi. In a 1977 interview on the Austrian Broadcasting Corporation, Rothstock reportedly boasted of Bettauer's "extinction".

References

Further reading
 

Austrian assassins
1990 deaths
1904 births
People acquitted of murder
People acquitted by reason of insanity
Nazi Party members